Wo Hop Shek Public Cemetery, in Wo Hop Shek near Fanling in Hong Kong, is the largest public cemetery in Hong Kong. The cemetery opened in 1950 in the New Territories as cemeteries began to reach capacity on Hong Kong Island. Wo Hop Shek covers 222.4 hectares with space for full and cremated remains. The cemetery is located in a hilly area ranging from 100 to over 300 metres.

Within the cemetery is Gallant Garden, a burial site for public servants killed on duty, opened in 1996 and is located to the northwest corner of the cemetery.

Wo Hop Shek Public Cemetery is a public cemetery managed by the Food and Environmental Hygiene Department.

Lam Tsuen Country Park is located the southwest of Wo Hop Shek.

See also
 List of cemeteries in Hong Kong

References

External links

 

Cemeteries in Hong Kong
Wo Hop Shek